Walton may refer to:

People
 Walton (given name)
 Walton (surname)
 Susana, Lady Walton (1926–2010), Argentine writer

Places

Canada
Walton, Nova Scotia, a community
Walton River (Nova Scotia)
Walton, Ontario, a hamlet

United Kingdom 
Walton, Aylesbury, Buckinghamshire
Walton, Milton Keynes, Buckinghamshire, a hamlet
Walton, Peterborough, a residential area and electoral ward of the city of Peterborough, Cambridgeshire
Walton, Cheshire, a village and civil parish
Walton, Cumbria, a village and civil parish
Walton, Chesterfield, Derbyshire, a suburb of Chesterfield
Walton-on-Trent, South Derbyshire, Derbyshire
Walton-on-the-Naze, Essex, a seafront town informally called "Walton"
Walton, Leicestershire, a village
Walton, Liverpool, an area of Liverpool, Merseyside
Walton Street, London
East Walton, Norfolk
West Walton, Norfolk
Walton, North East Derbyshire, a village in the civil parish of Holymoorside and Walton
Walton Manor, Oxford
Walton Street, Oxford
Walton, Powys, a village in Wales
Walton, Onibury, a location in Shropshire
Walton, Telford and Wrekin, a location in Shropshire
Walton, Somerset, near Street
Walton in Gordano, Somerset
Walton, Eccleshall, a location in Staffordshire
Walton, Stone, a location in Staffordshire
Walton, Suffolk, a settlement
Walton-on-Thames, Surrey
Walton, Warwickshire, a hamlet
Walton, Leeds, a village and civil parish
Walton, Wakefield, West Yorkshire
Walton Hill, a hill in Worcestershire

United States
Walton, Kentucky, a home rule-class city
Walton, Michigan, an unincorporated community
Walton (town), New York
Walton (village), New York, within the town
Walton, Oregon, an unincorporated community
Walton, West Virginia, an unincorporated community
Walton Mountain, Montana
Walton Mountain (New York)

Elsewhere
Walton, Lahore, Pakistan, a cantonment area outside Lahore
Walton Airport
Walton, New Zealand, a settlement on the North Island
Walton Mountains, Antarctica

Businesses
Walton Group, a Bangladeshi conglomerate
Walton Hi-Tech Industries Limited
Walton Micro-Tech Corporation
Walton Motors

Schools
Sam M. Walton College of Business, aka Walton College, the business college at the University of Arkansas in Fayetteville, Arkansas
Walton High School (disambiguation), various schools in the UK and the United States

Other uses
Walton (barque), a 19th-century Canadian ship
Walton (horse) (1799–1825), a British Thoroughbred racehorse
Bud Walton Arena, a basketball arena at the University of Arkansas, Fayetteville, Arkansas
Walton Arts Center, a performing arts center in Fayetteville, Arkansas
Walton Centre, a neurology hospital in the suburb of Fazakerley in the city of Liverpool, England
Walton Correctional Institution, Walton County, Florida
Walton Rowing Club, an amateur rowing club on the River Thames in England
Walton War, an 1804 boundary dispute between the U.S. states of North Carolina and Georgia

See also 
Walton County (disambiguation), United States
Walton Hall (disambiguation)
Walton House (disambiguation)
Walton-on-the-Hill, Surrey
Walton-on-the-Hill, Staffordshire
Walton-on-the-Naze, Essex
Walton on the Wolds, Leicestershire
Walton-on-Thames, Surrey
Walton-on-Trent, Derbyshire
Walton station (disambiguation)
Walton Township (disambiguation), United States
Waltons (disambiguation)
The Waltons (disambiguation)
Wolton (disambiguation)